is a Japanese role-playing mobile game released by GREE.  The series has been adapted separately into both a manga, titled , and an anime television series, titled . The manga was published by Kodansha in 2013, while the anime aired in 2016.

Plot
On the continent Kunaaan, there are three kingdoms, Saint Amoria, Ishilfeen and Vanlodis, with a fragile power balance that could spell disaster and war at any moment. The evil dragon Daganzord also resides on the continent and no one is powerful enough to stop him from spreading destruction and charred land in his wake. Bairo, Kismitete, and a party of wizards attempted to seal Daganzord, but were foiled and this event was known as the Balbagoa Tragedy. Hiiro, Bairo and Kismitete's son, is saved by Giiru and swears to avenge his parents death by training himself with the sword. After turning sixteen Hiiro, with Giruu accompanying him, sets out on a journey to slay the dragon. Along the way, they meet many types of people and gain companions on their journey.

Characters

Son of Bairo and Kismitete, the two who sought years ago to seal Dagan Zot.  Hiiro took part in the sealing ritual, but when the ritual failed Hiiro's father used a spell to switch his heart with Dagan Zot's, so that their lives would be bound to one another.  Since then Hiiro has been training to become a swordsman and find and defeat Dagan Zot, unaware that Dagan Zot's death means his own, and his death means Dagan Zot's.

A mysterious girl who encounters Hiiro in the desert.  Her exact nature is unknown, though she appears to have some knowledge of Dagan Zot and particularly likes the sound of Hiiro's (Dagan Zot's) heart. She has no external body temperature hence the ability to collect water on her skin from the desert air.

A cat-like information broker whose exact reason for following Hiiro is unknown.

A half-ogre who served Hiiro's parents before the ritual to seal Dagan Zot.  After the ritual failed and Hiiro's parents were killed, Girū took care of Hiiro and trained him in swordsmanship.

A young urchin who leads a gang of young thieves.

A weapons broker with immense power and influence across the kingdoms.  He deliberately fans the flames of war and uses a mixture of swindling and simple coercion to convince his many clients to use any means necessary to pay his high prices, even if the cost is the entire wealth of the region and all the clients' subjects.  He is a ruthless man who will never hesitate to take any opportunity to develop better merchandise, no matter how many lives are lost or doomed to torment in the process.

A love crazy magic user, who would do anything for her love, Nanbuuko. Because of her love, she agreed to be experimented on, and combined with her pet.

Mumuu is a rabbit like girl, who is easily influenced by money.
Bachroppa

Media

Game
Game producer GREE released the role-playing card battle game as a mobile game in 2011.

Manga
A manga adaptation by Seijirō Narumi launched in Kodansha's Bessatsu Shōnen Magazine in April 2013 and ran until November 2013.  The series was collected into two tankōbon volumes.

Anime
The game received an anime television adaptation to celebrate its fifth anniversary. The series is directed by Nobuhiro Kondo and written by Hiroshi Ōnogi, with animation by the studio Bridge. Character designs for the series are provided by Gō Tōgetsu, and Noboru Haraguchi served as the sound director at Tohokushinsha Film. Hideakira Kimura and Nobuaki Nobusawa provided the anime's music.

The opening theme song is "Resonant Heart" by Maaya Uchida, while the closing theme is "Xenotopia" by Suzuko Mimori.

The series premiered on 4 April 2016, and was broadcast on TV Tokyo, TV Osaka, TV Aichi, and AT-X. It was streamed on iQIYI, which co-produced the series. The series was simulcast by Crunchyroll under the title Cerberus.

References

External links

 
 
 

Anime television series based on video games
Bridge (studio)
Digital collectible card games
Fantasy anime and manga
Fantasy role-playing games
Genco
Japanese role-playing video games
Kodansha manga
Manga based on video games
Mobile games
Role-playing video games
Shōnen manga